Sergey Pavlovich Kalinin (Russian: Сергей Калинин, born March 17, 1991) is a Russian professional ice hockey forward for Traktor Chelyabinsk of the Kontinental Hockey League (KHL). He formerly played for the New Jersey Devils in the National Hockey League (NHL).

Playing career
Undrafted, Kalinin played professionally in his native Russia with Kontinental Hockey League club, Avangard Omsk. Kalinin spent five seasons with Avangard and in the 2014–15 season, he set career highs in all categories with 12 goals, 13 assists, 25 points, 49 penalty minutes and 58 games played, while serving as the club’s captain as a 23-year-old.

On May 29, 2015, Kalinin left Avangard Omsk and signed a one-year entry-level deal with the New Jersey Devils of the NHL. In the 2015–16 season, he made his NHL debut October 9, 2015 against the Winnipeg Jets at Prudential Center. Kalinin completed his first NHL campaign scoring eight goals and seven assists for 15 points with 33 penalty minutes in 78 games.

On July 6, 2016, Kalinin opted to remain with the Devils in agreeing to a one-year contract as a restricted free agent. Kalinin would record four points in 43 games with the Devils the following season, before being placed on waivers on February 17, 2017 for the purpose of being sent to the AHL. He cleared the following day, but was traded to the Toronto Maple Leafs in exchange for defensive prospect Viktor Lööv. Toronto opted to trade for Kalinin instead of claim him as claiming would have put the team at the 50 contract limit heading into the March 1 trade deadline, where trading Loov allows for some deadline flexibility. He was immediately assigned to the Toronto Marlies following the deal.

After finishing the year with the Marlies, Kalinin as a free agent from the Maple Leafs, chose to return to his native Russia, signing a three-year deal with SKA Saint Petersburg of the KHL on July 1, 2017.

Approaching the 2018–19 season, Kalinin was traded by SKA to fellow powerhouse club, HC CSKA Moscow in exchange for Andrei Kuzmenko on August 8, 2018.

Kalinin played two seasons with CSKA Moscow, before leaving as a free agent. On July 15, 2020, Kalinin agreed to a two-year contract with his fourth KHL club, Traktor Chelyabinsk.

International play

Kalinin has played for the Russian national team in the World Junior Championships and World Championships. He was a member of the Olympic Athletes from Russia team that won the gold medal at the 2018 Winter Olympics.

Career statistics

Regular season and playoffs

International

Awards and honors

References

External links

1991 births
Living people
Avangard Omsk players
HC CSKA Moscow players
New Jersey Devils players
Ice hockey players at the 2018 Winter Olympics
Olympic ice hockey players of Russia
Medalists at the 2018 Winter Olympics
Olympic medalists in ice hockey
Olympic gold medalists for Olympic Athletes from Russia
Russian ice hockey centres
Russian expatriate ice hockey people
Sportspeople from Omsk
SKA Saint Petersburg players
Toronto Marlies players
Traktor Chelyabinsk players
Undrafted National Hockey League players